William Alexander "Bud" Abbott (October 2, 1897 – April 24, 1974) was an American comedian, actor and producer. He was best known as the straight man half of the comedy duo Abbott and Costello.

Early life
Abbott was born in Asbury Park, New Jersey on October 2, 1897, into a show business family. His parents, Rae Fisher and Harry Abbott, had met while working for the Barnum and Bailey Circus. She was a bareback rider of German Jewish background and he was a concessionaire and forage agent. Bud was the third of the couple's four children. When Bud was a toddler, the family relocated to Harlem, then to the Coney Island section of Brooklyn, and his father became a longtime advance man for the Columbia Burlesque Wheel. During the summer, when burlesque was on hiatus, his father worked at Dreamland Park in Coney Island. Bud dropped out of grammar school to work at the park. In his teens, Abbott signed on as a cabin boy on a Norwegian steamer, but was soon forced to shovel coal. He worked his way back to the United States a year later.

Career
In his late teens, Abbott began working in the box office of the Casino Theatre in Brooklyn, a burlesque house on the Columbia wheel. He spent the next few years in burlesque box offices, rising to treasurer. In 1918, while working in Washington, D.C., he met and married Jenny Mae Pratt (1902–1981), a burlesque dancer and comedienne who performed as Betty Smith. They remained together until his death 55 years later. Betty performed on the Columbia Wheel, while Bud mostly remained behind the scenes. In 1923, he produced a cut-rate vaudeville tab show called Broadway Flashes, which toured on the small-time Gus Sun circuit. Abbott began performing as a straight man in the show when he could no longer afford to pay one. He continued producing and performing in burlesque shows on the Mutual Burlesque wheel, and as his reputation grew, he began working with veteran comedians like Harry Steppe and Harry Evanson.

Lou Costello and Hollywood
Abbott crossed paths with Lou Costello in the early 1930s, when Abbott was producing and performing in Minsky's Burlesque shows in New York, and Costello was a rising comic. They worked together for the first time in 1935 at the Eltinge Theatre on 42nd Street, after an illness sidelined Costello's regular partner. They formally teamed up in 1936, and performed together in burlesque, minstrel shows, what was left of vaudeville, and stage shows.

In 1938, they received national exposure as regulars on the Kate Smith Hour radio show, which led to roles in a Broadway musical, The Streets of Paris in 1939. In 1940, Universal signed the team for their first film, One Night in the Tropics. Despite having minor roles, Abbott and Costello stole the film with several classic routines, including an abbreviated version of "Who's On First?" Universal signed the team to a two-picture deal, and the first film, Buck Privates (1941), became a major hit and led to a long-term contract with the studio.

Arthur Lubin, who directed the team's first five starring films, later said: "I don't think there has ever been a finer straight man in the business than Bud Abbott. Lou would go off the script – because he was that clever with lines – and Bud would bring him right back."

During World War II, Abbott and Costello were among the most popular and highest-paid stars in the world. Between 1940 and 1956, they made 36 films and earned a percentage of the profits on each. They were among the Top 10 box office stars from 1941 through 1951, and placed No. 1 in 1942. They also had their own radio program (The Abbott and Costello Show) throughout the 1940s, first on NBC from 1942 to 1947, and from 1947 to 1949 on ABC. During a 35-day tour in the summer of 1942, the team sold $85 million worth of War Bonds.

In the 1950s, they introduced their comedy to live television on The Colgate Comedy Hour, and launched their own half-hour filmed series, The Abbott and Costello Show (1952–54).

Strain and split
Relations between Abbott and Costello were strained by egos and salary disputes. In burlesque, they split their earnings 60/40, favoring Abbott, because the straight man was always viewed as the more valuable member of the team. This was eventually changed to 50/50, but after a year in Hollywood, Costello insisted on a 60/40 split in his favor. It remained 60/40 for the rest of their careers. Costello also demanded that the team be renamed "Costello and Abbott," but this was rejected by Universal because the studio had been promoting "Abbott and Costello" for years. Abbott's top billing resulted in a "permanent chill" between the two partners, according to Lou's daughter Chris Costello in her biography Lou's on First. Their relationship was further strained by Abbott's alcohol abuse, a habit motivated by his desire to stave off epileptic seizures.

In mid-1945, the comedians were not on speaking terms after Costello fired a maid and Abbott, having no grievance with the maid, hired her. As Costello recalled in 1958: "She went to work for Abbott. I explained to Bud why I let her go, and asked him to fire her, but he wouldn't." Costello refused to speak to Abbott except when they were working. In 1946, the team's box office ranking dropped out of the Top 10 and the studio, with Costello's assent, split the team in character roles in two films: Little Giant and The Time of Their Lives. "Bud didn't like doing them at all," said Abbott's nephew Norman Abbott. "He felt that Lou wanted to go on and be a different kind of comedian, that he didn't want to be a team anymore. So the parts were written that way in couple of pictures, and it didn't work." Abbott resolved their personal situation when he suggested that the team's ongoing plans to build a civic center for underprivileged children be named after Costello's son, who drowned before his first birthday. The Lou Costello, Jr. Youth Foundation opened in Los Angeles in 1947 and is still serving the community.

The team's popularity waned in the mid-1950s, and the IRS demanded substantial back taxes, forcing the partners (both of whom had been free spenders and serious gamblers) to sell most of their assets, including the rights to many of their films. When the team's long-term contract with Universal was up in 1954, they demanded more money than the studio was willing to pay, and they were dropped after 14 years at the studio.

In November 1956, Costello was the subject of the Ralph Edwards-produced TV show This Is Your Life. A month later the team opened in Las Vegas. Unfortunately, the act went badly. Witnesses differ on exactly what happened (one version has Costello leading a drunk Abbott off the stage), but the accounts agree that Abbott's timing had slowed down noticeably, throwing Costello's responses off and embarrassing him.

Abbott and Costello split in 1957, shortly before Costello appeared on Steve Allen's variety show. Costello made solo appearances on several TV shows, including the Steve Allen show, and did one film, The Thirty-Foot Bride of Candy Rock (released posthumously in 1959.) Costello died on March 3, 1959.

Later years
Abbott faced financial difficulties in the late 1950s when the IRS disallowed $500,000 in tax exemptions which forced him to sell his home and come out of semi-retirement.

In 1960, Abbott began performing with a new partner, Candy Candido, to good reviews. But Abbott called it quits, remarking that "No one could ever live up to Lou." The following year, Abbott played a straight role in a dramatic television episode of General Electric Theater titled "The Joke's on Me". In 1962, he was interviewed by NBC's Jack Lescoulie, in a nostalgic segment. That year, as it's reported, Abbott was considered for a cameo in Stanley Kramer's comedy  "It's a Mad, Mad, Mad, Mad World".  In 1964, he suffered the first in a series of strokes and recuperated at the Motion Picture Country Home. The following year, he was filmed on the set of the Elvis Presley movie, Frankie and Johnny, with Barbara Stanwyck, Frank Sinatra and other celebrities when Presley donated $50,000 to the Motion Picture Relief Fund to help its $40 million building and endowment drive. In 1967, Abbott provided his own voice for the Hanna-Barbera animated series The Abbott and Costello Cartoon Show. Stan Irwin provided the voice of Lou Costello.

Personal life

Abbott suffered from epilepsy starting from about 1926.

Bud and Betty Abbott were married for 55 years. The couple adopted two children: Bud Jr. (August 23, 1939 – January 19, 1997) in 1942 and Rae Victoria (Vickie) (March 27, 1942 — April 28, 2021) in 1949.

Norman and Betty Abbott, the children of Bud's older sister, Olive, started their careers in Hollywood working behind the scenes on the Abbott and Costello films. Betty became Blake Edwards' longtime script supervisor, and Norman directed many episodic television series, including Leave It to Beaver, The Jack Benny Program, Sanford and Son and Welcome Back, Kotter.

Bud has three stars on the Hollywood Walk of Fame: the radio star is located at 6333 Hollywood Boulevard, the motion pictures star is located at 1611 Vine Street, and the television star is located at 6740 Hollywood Boulevard.

Death
Abbott died of cancer at age 76 on April 24, 1974, at his home in Woodland Hills, Los Angeles. He was cremated at Grandview Crematory in Glendale, California and his ashes scattered in the Pacific Ocean three miles out from Santa Monica.

His widow, Betty, died on September 12, 1981. 

When asked about Abbott shortly after his death, Groucho Marx replied that Abbott was "the greatest straight man ever."

Honors and awards
Abbott and Costello are among the few non-baseball personnel to be memorialized in the Baseball Hall of Fame, although they are not inductees of the Hall itself. A plaque and a gold record of the "Who's On First?" sketch have been on permanent display there since 1956, and the routine has run on an endless video loop in the exhibit area since 1967.

Abbott and Costello each have three stars on the Hollywood Walk of Fame for their work in radio, television and motion pictures.

In 1942, they were voted the country's No. 1 Box Office Stars by exhibitors. They ranked among the Top Ten in 1941, 1942, 1943, 1944, 1948, 1949, 1950 and 1951.

Abbott received the Lifetime Achievement Award for Acting (posthumously) from the Garden State Film Festival in 2006; it was accepted on his behalf by his daughter Vickie Abbott Wheeler.

Abbott is a 2009 inductee of the New Jersey Hall of Fame.

Filmography

Notes

References

External links

 
 
 
 

1897 births
1974 deaths
20th-century American comedians
 
American male comedians
American male comedy actors
American male film actors
American male radio actors
American male stage actors
American male television actors
American male voice actors
American burlesque performers
Universal Pictures contract players
Vaudeville performers
Male actors from New Jersey
Male actors from Los Angeles
New Jersey Hall of Fame inductees
People from Asbury Park, New Jersey
People with epilepsy
Deaths from cancer in California
20th-century American male actors
Comedians from California
Comedians from New Jersey
American people of German-Jewish descent